Gambat railway station is located in Gambat city, Khairpur District of Sindh province, Pakistan.

See also
 List of railway stations in Pakistan
 Pakistan Railways

References

Railway stations in Khairpur District
Railway stations on Karachi–Peshawar Line (ML 1)